The Key West race riot occurred in 1897, after a 19-year-old black man was accused of raping a white woman in the city. While there were attempts to lynch Sylvanus Johnson, the alleged perpetrator, an all-black group defended him at his jail. They killed a white man in the process, fomenting a race riot. Johnson was executed after a 21-minute deliberation by an all-white jury.

Background 
Key West, Florida, had been established for about a year when Sylvanus Johnson, a 19-year-old black man, was accused of raping Livington Atwell, a white woman. He had allegedly attacked her while she and three of her friends were collecting flowers in June 1897. He was jailed after Atwell identified him as her rapist. The night of the accusation, a mob of some 25 to 30 men tried to storm the jail and lynch Johnson. They failed, as the jail keeper did not turn him over; the jail keeper and his associates had drawn their guns on the white mob who attempted to access Johnson.

C.B. Pendleton, the owner and editor of two newspapers in the city, urged a lynching at the court hearing for Johnson: He had asked whether there were enough white men to lynch him. This was a public call, and the Miami Metropolis said it was intended to warn black residents of the city of a lynching. The Miami Metropolis also said it allowed them time to organize and prevent it; had Pendleton not said anything, they argued, he could have met no resistance. After Pendleton's outburst, a black resident called to lynch Pendleton, and a group swarmed the editor. He drew his guns and fled in a carriage. Soon, another group of black residents of the town surrounded the jail, promised to shoot any white person who tried to take Johnson, and threatened to burn down Key West. They shot William Gardner, a white man, that night.

Riot 
The sheriff thereafter formed a mob of some 40 people, and asked the governor to root out the black group. The governor, William D. Bloxham, in turn asked for assistance from president William McKinley and his secretary of war. With his group formed, the sheriff had prevented much disturbance throughout the town; his shooting of a black resident may have influenced this. Ultimately, there was no revenge by the white residents of the town against the black residents.

Aftermath 
Newspapers around the United States blamed the violence on Johnson, although the Afro-American Sentinel from Omaha, Nebraska, praised the black community's vigorous defense of him.

An all-white jury was empaneled for Johnson's criminal case, and after 21 minutes of deliberation, found him guilty. He was ordered to be hanged, and he was executed on 21 September 1897 as thousands of people watched.

Notes and references

Notes

Citations

Bibliography

 
 
 
 
 

1897 in Florida
Race riots in the United States
Racially motivated violence against African Americans
History of racism in Florida